Dolomedes facetus, commonly known as clever fishing spider, is a species of medium to large-sized fishing spider, which is endemic to Australia, where it lives in freshwater ponds and waterways in the coastal areas, ranging from Western Australia to Tasmania. It is  common in northern parts of Australia, particularly Queensland and the Northern Territory.

References

Taxa named by Ludwig Carl Christian Koch
Spiders described in 1876
facetus